The 2016–17 season the club was in the top Ukrainian football league for FC Desna Chernihiv. Desna competed in First League, Ukrainian Cup.

Players

Squad information

Transfers

In

Out

Statistics

Appearances and goals

|-
! colspan=16 style=background:#dcdcdc; text-align:center| Goalkeepers

|-
! colspan=16 style=background:#dcdcdc; text-align:center| Defenders

|-
! colspan=16 style=background:#dcdcdc; text-align:center| Midfielders 

|-
! colspan=16 style=background:#dcdcdc; text-align:center| Forwards

 
|-
! colspan=16 style=background:#dcdcdc; text-align:center| Players transferred out during the season
 

Last updated: 31 May 2019

Goalscorers

Last updated: 31 May 2019

References

External links
 Official website

FC Desna Chernihiv
Desna Chernihiv
FC Desna Chernihiv seasons